Howard Love (born June 9, 1960) is an American executive, author and entrepreneur. Love is the former CEO of LoveToKnow Media, a digital publishing group.

Early life 
Love was born in Detroit in 1960. He is the grandson of WWI flying ace George Augustus Vaughn Jr. and US industrialist George H. Love. His father, Howard M. "Pete" Love, was the CEO and chairman of National Steel and served on the boards of TWA and Monsanto. He attended Phillips Exeter Academy (1974–1978) and Colgate University (1978–1983).

Career 
Love is an angel investor who has been an entrepreneur since the 1980s, and has founded or co-founded over 15 companies.

His first business book, The Start-Up J Curve (Greenleaf Book Group) was published in 2016.

Personal life 
Love currently resides in the United States.

References

External links 

HowardLove.com

1960 births
Living people
American business writers
American chief executives
American investors
Angel investors
Businesspeople from Detroit
Colgate University alumni
Phillips Exeter Academy alumni